Nizhneye Gribtsovo is a rural locality (a village) in Parfyonovskoye Rural Settlement, Velikoustyugsky District, Vologda Oblast, Russia. The population was 9 as of 2002.

Geography 
Nizhneye Gribtsovo is located 19 km south of Veliky Ustyug (the district's administrative centre) by road. Semennikovo is the nearest rural locality.

References 

Rural localities in Velikoustyugsky District